Charles M. McDermott (born 10 September 1912) was an English professional footballer who played as a left back.

Career
Born in Goole, McDermott played for Goole Town and Bradford City. For Bradford City, he made 160 appearances in the Football League; he also made 8 FA Cup appearances. He also guested for Hartlepool United during World War Two.

Sources

References

1912 births
Year of death missing
English footballers
Goole Town F.C. players
Bradford City A.F.C. players
Hartlepool United F.C. wartime guest players
English Football League players
Association football fullbacks